James Anthony Brown (born in Columbia, South Carolina) is an American comedian, actor and radio personality. He received the Peabody Award and the NAACP Image Award.

Biography

Early life
Brown started his career in Atlanta, Georgia, after relocating there from his home in South Carolina almost thirty years ago. Having attended Denmark Technical College, an HBCU in Denmark, South Carolina, Brown is a tailor by trade and aspired to be a clothing designer before putting together a comedy routine after entering a local 'gong show' contest in a local nightclub, Mr. V's Figure Eight. Invited back to host on a regular basis, Brown became a fixture, performing there for the next two years.

Professional career
He left Atlanta for Los Angeles, California, in 1989 to pursue work in television, quickly finding a job as a staff writer for the nationally syndicated, late-night talk show, The Arsenio Hall Show. After five years, Brown found other writing assignments for such sitcoms as The Parent'Hood and Me and the Boys.

He has performed on Vibe, Def Comedy Jam, It's Showtime at the Apollo, An Evening at the Improv and The Oprah Winfrey Show, and had recurring roles on Moesha, Living Single and The Parenthood, as well as guest spots on The Parkers and Sparks. His motion picture work includes roles in Def Jam's How to Be a Player, Pay the Price, Drumline and Mr. 3000. He has also warmed up audiences at the tapings of Martin, Sister, Sister, Roc and Hangin' with Mr. Cooper.

From 1996 until 25 November 2016, Brown appeared on the Tom Joyner Morning Show, a nationwide radio show broadcast from Dallas, Texas.

Brown is currently on the national radio show The Steve Harvey Morning Show.
Brown was awarded a NAACP Image Award and Peabody Award in 1993 for his contribution to reconstruction after the 1992 LA uprising.

Brown is working as executive producer for an upcoming reality competition TV show

In February 2020, it was announced that Brown has been cast in Tyler Perry's Assisted Living which is set to air on BET on 2 September 2020.

Personal life
Brown was initiated into Phi Beta Sigma fraternity, Eta Beta Sigma alumni chapter in Nashville. He is the owner of the J. Anthony Brown Collection, The J. Spot Clothing Store, and The J. Anthony Brown Comedy Store in Los Angeles, California.

Both of Brown's parents died from diabetes.

Notes

References
Christian, Margena A. (15 December 2008) "Comedian J. Anthony Brown Controls His Destiny As Entrepreneur", Jet 114(22):  p. 30
Staff (17 April 2000) "J. Anthony Brown Pens Book Based on His Popular 'Rev. Adenoids' Radio Sketch"  Jet 97(19): p. 36
Staff (1999) "The house that J. Anthony built" Black Elegance Jul/Aug 1999, Issue 121, pp. 58–61

Living people
Male actors from Columbia, South Carolina
Denmark Technical College alumni
Comedians from South Carolina
20th-century American comedians
20th-century American male actors
21st-century American comedians
21st-century American male actors
American male television actors
American male film actors
1950 births